A list of films produced in Poland in the 2010s.

See also
List of Polish films of 2014
List of Polish films of 2016
List of Polish films of 2017

References

External links
 Polish film at the Internet Movie Database

2010